Charles Edward Eaton (June 25, 1916 – March 23, 2006) was an American poet and professor.

Life
He was born in Winston-Salem, N.C. Eaton received his B.A. degree from the University of North Carolina in 1936, studied at Princeton, and received his M.A. degree from Harvard, where he worked with Robert Frost, who later recommended him to the Bread Loaf Writers' Conference.

Eaton served as Vice Consul in Brazil, 1942–1946, and as professor of creative writing at UNC, 1946-1952. In 1950, he married Isabel Patterson of Pittsburgh.

His papers are at the University of North Carolina.

Awards
 Golden Rose Award
 1981 Arvon Foundation competition winner

Works

Poetry

Stories

Non-Fiction

References

American male poets
University of North Carolina at Chapel Hill alumni
English-language poets
Harvard University alumni
Princeton University alumni
1916 births
2006 deaths
University of North Carolina at Chapel Hill faculty
20th-century American poets
20th-century American male writers